1999 Avenue of the Stars, formerly SunAmerica Center, and before that, AIG–SunAmerica Center, is a 39-story,  skyscraper in Century City, Los Angeles, California. The tower was completed in 1990. Designed by Johnson Fain, It is the twentieth-tallest building in Los Angeles and the third-tallest building in Century City. On-site parking is available in an eight-level attached garage.

SunAmerica Center received the BOMA International 2001/2002 Office Building of the Year Award.

In late March 2009, all visible AIG logos were removed from the building

Tenants 

 Moelis & Company
 Goldman Sachs
 Morgan Stanley
 Credit Suisse
 Bain & Company
 Lazard
 Bloomberg L.P.
 Consulate General of the United Arab Emirates
 AECOM
Simpson Thacher & Bartlett
 UBS

See also 

 List of tallest buildings in Los Angeles
 List of tallest buildings in California

References

External links
1999 Avenue of the Stars official website 

Skyscraper office buildings in Los Angeles
Buildings and structures completed in 1990
Century City, Los Angeles